The Raw Air 2020 is the fourth edition of Raw Air for men, a ten-day tournament for men in ski jumping and ski flying held across Norway between 6–15 March 2020; and the 2nd edition for women, a six-day tournament in ski jumping held across Norway between 7–12 March 2020. It is part of the 2019/20 World Cup season.

Competition format 
The competition is held on four different hills for men Oslo, Lillehammer, Trondheim and Vikersund; and on three hills without Vikersund for women. It lasts for ten consecutive days with a total of 16 rounds from individual events, team events and qualifications (prologues) for men; and for six consecutive days with total of 9 rounds from individual events and qualifications (prologues) for women.

Men

Women

Participants

Men

Women

Schedule

Map of hosts 

 Men & Women
 Men only

Men

Women

Men's team

Standings

Men's Raw Air

Women's Raw Air

References 

2020
2020 in ski jumping
2020 in Norwegian sport
March 2020 sports events in Europe
Sports events curtailed due to the COVID-19 pandemic